Thierry Smolderen (born 25 November 1954) is an essay writer, and a scenario writer of Belgian comic strips, for example of Gipsy.

He is a teacher at École des Beaux-Arts of Angoulême, and he devotes his energy to realising Coconino World, the webzine he animates with some friends and former students. As a comic books historian, he wrote Naissances de la bande dessinée (2009), about the "platinum age" of comics. This book has been published in English by the University Press of Mississippi in 2014, under the title The Origins of Comics: From William Hogarth to Winsor McCay (Eisner Award nominee of 2015 in the Best Scholarly/Academic Work category).

External links 
Some on-line publications at Coconino World.

Belgian comics writers
1954 births
Living people
Academic staff of the École des Beaux-Arts
Comics critics